John Taylor (1 November 1808 – 25 July 1887) was an English-born religious leader who served as the third president of the Church of Jesus Christ of Latter-day Saints (LDS Church) from 1880 to 1887. He is the first and so far only president of the LDS Church to have been born outside the United States.

Early life 
Taylor was born in Milnthorpe, Westmorland (now part of Cumbria), England, the son of James and Agnes Taylor. He had formal schooling up to age fourteen, and then he served an initial apprenticeship to a cooper and later received training as a woodturner and cabinetmaker. He claimed that as a young man, he had a vision of "an angel in the heavens, holding a trumpet to his mouth, sounding a message to the nations"—which he would later identify as the angel Moroni. He was christened in the Church of England, but joined the Methodist church at sixteen. He was appointed a lay preacher a year later, and felt a calling to preach in North America. Taylor's parents and siblings emigrated to Upper Canada (present-day Ontario) in 1830. Taylor stayed in England to dispose of the family property and joined his family in Toronto in 1832. He met Leonora Cannon from the Isle of Man while attending a Toronto Methodist Church and, although she initially rejected his proposal, married her on 28 January 1833.

Between 1834 and 1836, John and Leonora Taylor participated in a religious study group in Toronto. The group discussed problems and concerns with their Methodist faith, and quickly became known as the "Dissenters." Other members included Joseph Fielding and his sisters Mary and Mercy, who later also became prominent in the Latter Day Saint movement. While in Toronto, Taylor continued to work in his trade as a woodturner.

Early church service 
Taylor and his wife first came in contact with the Church of the Latter Day Saints in 1836 after meeting Parley P. Pratt, an apostle in the church, in Toronto. Leonora was the first to join the church and she persuaded Taylor to continue his studies with Pratt. After the couple's baptism into the church, they were active in preaching and the organization of the church in Upper Canada. Taylor for a time presided over six branches in the Toronto area. In July 1837 he was closely involved in coordinating Joseph Smith's visit to the Toronto area. They then moved to Far West, Missouri, where Taylor was ordained an apostle on 19 December 1838. He assisted other church members as they fled frequent conflicts to Commerce, Illinois (soon after renamed Nauvoo).

In 1839, Taylor and some of his fellow apostles served missions in Britain. While there, Taylor preached in Liverpool and was responsible for Mormon preaching in Ireland and the Isle of Man.

Nauvoo 
Taylor returned to Nauvoo, Illinois, to serve as a city councilman, a chaplain, a colonel, a newspaper editor, and a judge advocate for the Nauvoo Legion. Taylor edited two newspapers in Nauvoo, Times and Seasons and the Nauvoo Neighbor. Times and Seasons was the official organ of the Latter Day Saint church; he was officially the assistant editor under Joseph Smith, but due to Smith also being president of the church, Taylor made most of the editorial decisions. Taylor also edited the more politically concerned Nauvoo Neighbor and the Wasp, the predecessor of the Nauvoo Neighbor, for about a year. Taylor was thus the editor of Nauvoo's two main papers from 1842 to 1846.

In 1842, Taylor was present at the organization of the Relief Society. He set apart Sarah Cleveland and Elizabeth Ann Whitney as counselors to Emma Smith.

In 1844, Taylor was with church founder Joseph Smith, his brother Hyrum Smith, and fellow apostle Willard Richards in the Carthage, Illinois, jail when the Smiths were killed by a mob. Taylor was severely wounded in the conflict. His life may have been spared when a musket ball directed towards his chest was stopped by a pocket watch which he was carrying at the time. However, recent analysis shows the watch may instead have been damaged when Taylor fell against the windowsill.

In 1845, Taylor became the president of the Nauvoo Tradesmen Association.  This group worked to encourage local manufacturing of goods for both local use and export.  Taylor had two assistants who aided him in running this group, Orson Spencer and Phineas Richards.

Migration to the Salt Lake Valley 
In 1846–1847, most Latter-day Saints followed Brigham Young into Iowa then the Salt Lake Valley, while Taylor went to England to resolve problems in church leadership there. On his return, he and Pratt led more Latter-day Saints, a group of about 1500, to the Salt Lake Valley, where Young and the others had settled and established Great Salt Lake City.

Government positions
Taylor applied for and was granted United States citizenship in 1849.  That same year he was appointed an associate judge in the provisional State of Deseret.  He later served in the Utah territorial legislature from 1853 to 1876. Taylor was elected Speaker of the House for five consecutive sessions, beginning in 1857. In 1852, he wrote a small book, The Government of God, in which he compared and contrasted the secular and ecclesiastical political systems.

From 1868 to 1870 Taylor served as a probate judge of Utah County, Utah.  He also served as superintendent of schools for Utah Territory beginning in 1876.

Mission president
Taylor served as president of two missions of the LDS Church. In 1849, he began missionary work in France and was the first church mission president in the country. While in France, Taylor published a monthly newspaper called L'Etoile du Deseret with the help of Louis A. Bertrand.  He also supervised missionary work in Germany, but did not himself go to any of the countries that would later form Germany.

In 1852, the Book of Mormon was published in French, with Taylor and Curtis E. Bolton credited as translators. Taylor supervised the translation, which was carried out by Bolton, Bertrand, Lazare Auge, and a "Mr. Wilhelm".

Taylor later served as president of the Eastern States Mission, based in New York City. In this capacity he published a newspaper that presented the position of the Latter-day Saints.

Utah economic development
While serving as mission president in France, Taylor was directed by church president Brigham Young to prepare to establish a sugar industry in Utah Territory. This was done under the auspices of the Deseret Manufacturing Company.  Taylor purchased sugar-making equipment in Liverpool while returning to the United States. These early attempts to produce sugar in Utah proved unsuccessful.

Musical ability
Taylor is reported to have had a marvelous singing voice.  At the request of Hyrum Smith, he twice sang the song "A Poor Wayfaring Man of Grief" in Carthage Jail just before the Smith brothers' murders.

Taylor wrote the lyrics to several hymns, some of which are still used by the LDS Church. In 2005, Taylor's hymn "Joseph the Seer" was sung at the LDS Church's celebration of the 200th anniversary of Joseph Smith's birth. The 1985 English-language edition of the LDS Church hymnal includes two hymns with lyrics by Taylor, "Go Ye Messengers of Glory" (no. 262)  and "Go, Ye Messengers of Heaven" (no. 327).

Church president 
Following Brigham Young's death in 1877, the Quorum of the Twelve Apostles governed the church, with John Taylor as the quorum's president. Taylor became the third president of the church in 1880. He chose as his counselors Joseph F. Smith and George Q. Cannon, the latter being the nephew of his wife, Leonora.

As church president, Taylor oversaw the expansion of the Salt Lake community; the further organization of the church hierarchy; the establishment of Mormon colonies in Wyoming, Colorado, and Arizona as well as in Canada's Northwest Territories (now in Alberta) and the Mexican state of Chihuahua; and the defense of plural marriage against increasing government opposition.

While he was church president, Taylor also established Zion's Central Board of Trade to coordinate local trade and production, which was done largely through the local stakes, on a wider basis.

In 1878, the Primary Association was founded by Aurelia Spencer Rogers in Farmington, Utah Territory. For a time, the organization was placed under the direction of Relief Society General President Eliza R. Snow. In 1880, Taylor organized the churchwide adoption of the Primary Association and selected Louie B. Felt as its first general president. In October 1880, the Pearl of Great Price was canonized by the church.

Taylor also oversaw the issuance of a new edition of the Doctrine and Covenants. During his term as church president, the seventies quorums were also more fully and regularly organized.

In 1882, the United States Congress enacted the Edmunds Act, which declared polygamy to be a felony. Hundreds of Mormon men and women were arrested and imprisoned for continuing to practice plural marriage. Taylor had followed Brigham Young's teachings on polygamy and had at least seven wives. He is known to have fathered 34 children.

Taylor moved into the Gardo House alone with his sister, Agnes, to avoid prosecution and to avoid showing preference to any one of his families. However, by 1885, he and his counselors were forced to withdraw from public view to live in the "underground" and were frequently on the move to avoid arrest. In 1885, during his last public sermon, Taylor remarked, "I would like to obey and place myself in subjection to every law of man. What then? Am I to disobey the law of God? Has any man a right to control my conscience, or your conscience?... No man has a right to do it."

Many viewed Mormon polygamy as religiously, socially, and politically threatening. In 1887, the US Congress passed the Edmunds–Tucker Act, which abolished women's suffrage in Utah Territory, forced wives to testify against their husbands, disincorporated the LDS Church, dismantled the Perpetual Emigrating Fund Company, abolished the Nauvoo Legion, and provided that LDS Church property in excess of $50,000 would be forfeited to the United States.

For two-and-a-half years, Taylor presided over the church from exile. During this period, some Mormon fundamentalist groups claim that he received the 1886 Revelation. Photographs of the original document exist. It restated the permanence of the "New and Everlasting Covenant", which these fundamentalist groups consider to be a direct reference to the practice of plural marriage. The validity of the revelation is rejected by the LDS Church, which does not consider it to be authentic, but it is used by fundamentalist groups as justification for their continued practice of polygamy.

Death
Taylor died on 25 July 1887, from congestive heart failure in Kaysville, Utah Territory. Taylor was buried at the Salt Lake City Cemetery in The Avenues, Salt Lake City, Utah. For two years after his death, the church again was without a presidency. The Quorum of the Twelve Apostles, with Wilford Woodruff as president of the quorum, assumed leadership during this interim period. In the April 1889 church general conference, the First Presidency was reorganized with Wilford Woodruff as the president. Six months later, in the October general conference, Anthon H. Lund was called to fill Woodruff's vacancy in the Quorum of the Twelve Apostles.

Taylor's teachings as an apostle were the 2003 course of study in the LDS Church's Sunday Relief Society and Melchizedek priesthood classes.

Family
Taylor practiced plural marriage and was married to eight wives: Leonora Cannon, Elizabeth Kaighin, Jane Ballantyne, Mary Ann Oakley, Sophia Whitaker, Harriet Whitaker, Margaret Young, and Josephine Elizabeth Roueche. He was the father of 34 children.

Taylor's son, John W. Taylor, continued to serve in the church and in politics and helped to shepherd Utah to statehood in 1896. John W. Taylor was ultimately excommunicated from the LDS Church for his opposition to the church's abandonment of plural marriage. His son, Samuel W. Taylor, became a writer, and the biographer of his father and grandfather.

Another son, William W. Taylor, served as one of the first presidents of the seventy and also served in the Utah territorial legislature.

Taylor's wife Margaret Young Taylor was a member of the inaugural general presidency of what is today the church's Young Women organization. Taylor's daughter Annie Taylor Hyde was a leader in the Relief Society general presidency and was the founder of Daughters of Utah Pioneers.

Wives

Works 
 
 
 
 
 
 
  LDS Church publication number 35969.

See also 

 Cannon family

Notes and references

Sources 
 Allen, James B.; Glen M. Leonard. The Story of the Latter-day Saints. Deseret Book Co., Salt Lake City, UT, 1976. .
 Krakauer, Jon. Under the Banner of Heaven: A Story of Violent Faith (Doubleday, New York, 2003). . The book takes its title from part of a speech given by Taylor on 4 January 1880 in defense of the Mormon practice of polygamy: "We believe in honesty, morality, and purity; but when they enact tyrannical laws, forbidding us the free exercise of our religion, we cannot submit. God is greater than the United States, and when the Government conflicts with heaven, we will be ranged under the banner of heaven and against the Government."
 
 Nibley, Preson. The Presidents of the Church. Deseret Book Company, Salt Lake City, UT, 1974. .
 Taylor, Mark H. Editor. Witness to the Martyrdom Deseret Book Company, Salt Lake City, UT, 1999. .

Further reading

External links 

Links to texts
 
 
 
Other links
 Grampa Bill's G.A. Pages: John Taylor
 Biography at Joseph Smith Papers Project website
 Homes of John Taylor Pictures of some of John Taylor's houses.
The Milo Andrus, Jr. Website includes the John Taylor family with ancestry and descendants.
 
 John Taylor letters, MSS 677 at L. Tom Perry Special Collections, Brigham Young University

1808 births
1887 deaths
19th-century American musicians
19th-century American politicians
19th-century English musicians
19th-century Mormon missionaries
19th-century translators
American Latter Day Saint hymnwriters
American Latter Day Saint writers
American people of English descent
Angelic visionaries
Apostles (LDS Church)
Apostles of the Church of Christ (Latter Day Saints)
British woodworkers
Burials at Salt Lake City Cemetery
Canadian general authorities (LDS Church)
Cannon family
Converts to Mormonism from Methodism
Doctrine and Covenants people
Editors of Latter Day Saint publications
English Latter Day Saint hymnwriters
English Latter Day Saint writers
English Mormon missionaries
English emigrants to pre-Confederation Ontario
English emigrants to the United States
English general authorities (LDS Church)
Immigrants to Upper Canada
Lynching survivors in the United States
Members of the Utah Territorial Legislature
Mission presidents (LDS Church)
Missionary linguists
Mormon apologists
Mormon missionaries in France
Mormon missionaries in Ireland
Mormon missionaries in the Isle of Man
Mormon missionaries in the United Kingdom
Mormon missionaries in the United States
Mormon pioneers
Musicians from Toronto
Nauvoo, Illinois city council members
People from Milnthorpe
People from Nauvoo, Illinois
People from Old Toronto
Pre-Confederation Canadian emigrants to the United States
Presidents of the Church (LDS Church)
Presidents of the Quorum of the Twelve Apostles (LDS Church)
Taylor family (Latter Day Saints)
Translators of the Book of Mormon
Writers from Salt Lake City
Writers from Toronto
British general authorities (LDS Church)
American general authorities (LDS Church)